Sanford is a town in Hutchinson County, Texas, United States. The population was 164 at the 2010 census, down from 203 at the 2000 census.

On December 28, 1974, Hee Haw Season 6, Episode 16, Red Steagall saluted his hometown of Sanford, population 181.

History
Sanford was established in 1927 following discovery of natural gas in what became known as the Panhandle Gas Field. The town was named for pioneer rancher James McEuin Sanford (1864–1933).

Geography

Sanford is located in southwestern Hutchinson County at  (35.702626, –101.531773), at the intersection of Ranch Roads 687 and 1319.

Demographics

As of the census of 2000, there were 203 people, 82 households, and 59 families residing in the town. The population density was 1,517.1 people per square mile (602.9/km2). There were 113 housing units at an average density of 844.5 per square mile (335.6/km2). The racial makeup of the town was 95.57% White, 1.48% Native American, 0.49% from other races, and 2.46% from two or more races. Hispanic or Latino of any race were 5.42% of the population.

There were 82 households, out of which 28.0% had children under the age of 18 living with them, 57.3% were married couples living together, 11.0% had a female householder with no husband present, and 28.0% were non-families. 26.8% of all households were made up of individuals, and 9.8% had someone living alone who was 65 years of age or older. The average household size was 2.48 and the average family size was 3.02.

In the town, the population was spread out, with 25.6% under the age of 18, 8.9% from 18 to 24, 25.6% from 25 to 44, 23.2% from 45 to 64, and 16.7% who were 65 years of age or older. The median age was 40 years. For every 100 females, there were 109.3 males. For every 100 females age 18 and over, there were 112.7 males.

The median income for a household in the town was $28,672, and the median income for a family was $29,375. Males had a median income of $27,750 versus $16,250 for females. The per capita income for the town was $12,208. About 24.2% of families and 27.6% of the population were below the poverty line, including 45.9% of those under the age of eighteen and 7.4% of those 65 or over.

Education
The town is served by the Sanford-Fritch Independent School District.

References

Towns in Hutchinson County, Texas
Towns in Texas
1927 establishments in Texas